William Edward Eaton (20 April 1909 – 1 April 1938) was a British long-distance runner. He competed in the men's 10,000 metres at the 1936 Summer Olympics. He died of pneumonia less than two years later, aged 28.

References

External links
 

1909 births
1938 deaths
Athletes (track and field) at the 1936 Summer Olympics
British male long-distance runners
Olympic athletes of Great Britain
Place of birth missing
Deaths from pneumonia in the United Kingdom